Nilanjana may refer to:

Entertainment
Nilanjana (film), a 2017 Sri Lankan film

People
Nilanjana Roy, an author from India
Nilanjana Dasgupta, a Professor of Psychology 
Nilanjana Sharma, an actor and director from India
Jhumpa Lahiri, Nilanjana Sudeshna, an American author of Indian origin
Nilanjana Sarkar, a playback singer from India